The New Star incident was an event that occurred near the eastern port city of Vladivostok, when a Russian warship fired on a Chinese cargo vessel called the New Star. The cargo ship was sunk on February 15, 2009, with Russia and China presenting different stories regarding the incident.

New Star

The New Star (新星 Xīnxīng) was a 5000-ton ship leased by a company based in Hong Kong.  There were 16 crew members, 6 Indonesian and 10 Chinese citizens. The vessel was owned by Tongyu Shipping Zhejiang (浙江通宇船務有限公司) and leased to the Hong Kong based J-Rui Lucky shipping company (香港吉瑞祥（香港）有限公司 Xiānggǎng jí ruìxiáng (Xiānggǎng) yǒuxiàn gōngsī).

The RIA Novosti said crew members attempted to escape in two life-rafts after their ship was sinking. Only half of them were rescued by a Russian vessel. According to Xinhua News Agency, 7 sailors were still missing and only 3 were rescued.

See also
United Nations Flight 544 shootdown

References

Additional sources
http://www.chinadaily.com.cn/china/2009-02/20/content_7495973.htm
http://www.bloomberg.com/apps/news?pid=20601080&sid=acUuNBiKjveM&refer=asia
http://www.lloydslist.com/ll/news/new-star-pursued-by-russian-coast-guard-before-sinking/20017619947.htm
https://www.google.com/hostednews/canadianpress/article/ALeqM5jNrh6cf0HfTyzYkoHh9yZ8Azmf7w
http://www.nytimes.com/2009/02/21/world/asia/21china.html?ref=world

In Chinese:武汉综合新闻网:新星号货轮沉船事件3名获救中国船员启程回国 Google translation
In Chinese:山西新闻网 山西晚报:沉船事件仍然扑朔迷离（图）Google translation
In Chinese:世界经理人 :俄罗斯远东军事检察院分院对沉船事件刑事立案Google translation
In Chinese:舜网-济南时报:山东律师任沉船事件法律顾问Google translation
In Chinese:青年時報:新星号船东再发声明抗议俄方不公开调查沉船事件Google translation
In Chinese:德國之聲中文網:“新星号事件”俄中各有说法 Google translation
InChinese:解放日報:失踪的7名中国船员中5具遗体被发现中方不能接受俄就沉船表态 为何只救出一艘小艇
In Chinese:东方早报 选稿:黄骏:新星号船主:俄编弥天大谎欲掩盖真相推责任 Google translation
In Chinese:“新星”号沉没“罗生门”   编辑：航运信息网 Google translation

External links

QQ.com coverage

2009 disasters in Russia
China–Russia relations
Maritime incidents in 2009
Maritime incidents in Russia
History of Vladivostok